Katsuhito (written: , , , ,  or ) is a masculine Japanese given name. Notable people with the name include:

, Japanese anime director and screenwriter
, Japanese politician
, Japanese cross-country skier
, Japanese film director
, Japanese economist
, Japanese baseball player
, Japanese photographer
, Japanese politician
, Japanese politician and lawyer

Japanese masculine given names